Erbusaig is a small remote township, situated on Erbusaig Bay near Kyle of Lochalsh, Scottish Highlands and is in the council area of Highland. In the language of Gaelic, the village is named after Erb, a Viking who landed in the Bay. Erbusaig was initially a fishing village, but became cut off from the shore when the railway was extended to Kyle of Lochalsh in 1897.

Settlements
The fishing villages of Drumbuie and Duirinish, are situated less than 1 mile northeast.

References

Populated places in Lochalsh